Esther Opoti Dhugira (9 September 1962 - 18 August 2001) was a Ugandan legislator and Woman Member of Parliament for Nebbi District in Uganda's 7th Parliament . In Uganda's Constituent Assembly between 1994 and 1995, she represented Okoro County in Nebbi. Dhugira alongside Winnie Byanyima and others was one of the founders of Forum for Women in Democracy (FOWODE)

Background and education 
According to her eulogy given by Loyce Bwambale at a parliamentary sitting in 2001, Dhugira was born to Onenoth Opoti Jalmoi, a District Education Officer and Vitali Opoti in Kituli town

She attended a number of primary schools such as Arua Public School in 1969 and completed her primary education at Kitgum Public School. She proceeded to Kitgum High School, Dr. Obote College, and Boroboro in Lira, where she finished her O’level studies in 1983. 

Dhugira obtained a Diploma in Education at Onyama National Teachers College in Gulu as well as Nkozi Teachers Training College in 1987.

She later attended Makerere University where she graduated with a Bachelor of Social Sciences Degree, specialising in Political Science with a bias in Public Administration and Psychology.

Career 
In 1998, Dhugira was a teacher at Erusi Senior Secondary School in Nebbi and thereafter she joined the National Resistance Council (NRC) in 1989.

She was elected to the Board of Directors, Kinyara Sugar Works Limited in 1991 and was also a Director at Immigration Control Board, from 1994.She was also a Member of the Appointments Board at the Institute of Education, ITEK – Kyambogo.

During Uganda's 1994 Ugandan Constituent Assembly election, Dhugira was elected as the delegate to represent Okoro County in Nebbi.

She unsuccessfully contested for the position of Member of Parliament in 1996 against the late Anthony Ofwori Rugete. She contested again in the 2001 general elections and was the Woman Representative for Nebbi in Uganda's seventh Parliament till her death in the same year. She was replaced by Betty Odongo Pacuto

In 1995, alongside others : Winnie Byanyima, Solome Mukisa, Betty Akech, Loyce Bwambale, Tezira Jamwa, Margaret Zziwa, Benigna Mukiibi and Margaret Ssebagereka, Dhugira co-founded Forum for Women in Democracy (FOWODE)

Personal life 
Dhugira died in Mulago Hospital on 9 September 1962. She was survived by two daughters.

See also 

 Parliament of Uganda
 Nebbi district

References

External links 
Website of FOWODE Uganda

1962 births
2001 deaths
Ugandan women
People from Nebbi District
Members of the Parliament of Uganda
Makerere University alumni
20th-century Ugandan politicians
20th-century Ugandan women politicians